E83 may refer to:
 European route E83, a road
 Panno variation of the King's Indian Defence, Sämisch Variation, Encyclopaedia of Chess Openings code
 Daisan Keihin Road and Yokohama Shindō, route E83 in Japan